Eburodacrys luederwaldti is a species of beetle in the family Cerambycidae. It was described by Melzer in 1922.

References

Eburodacrys
Beetles described in 1922